The 2019 Tour de Yorkshire was a four-day cycling stage race held in Yorkshire over 2–5 May 2019. It was the fifth edition of the Tour de Yorkshire, organised by Welcome to Yorkshire and the Amaury Sport Organisation. The race was rated as a 2.HC event as part of the UCI Europe Tour.

The race started in Doncaster on 2 May and finished in Leeds on the 5 May. It was broadcast on ITV.

Route
In December 2018, the stages were announced, coupled with names, and the final stage of Halifax to Leeds being named The Yorkshire Classic. The Halifax to Leeds race was also the final stage in the 2018 Tour de Yorkshire and at the launch event, Sir Gary Verity revealed that this stage would be repeated as the final stage in each future iteration of the TdY, with a minor tweak or two.

This will result in a course totalling  over four days. The course will also see the riders climb a cumulative  over the four days,  and for the first time, the women's race will be run on the Friday and Saturday (the 3 and 4 of May) using exactly the same routes as the men's race (stages 2 and 3).

Teams
Nineteen teams were announced as partaking in the event. These were:

In May 2019, Team Sky was renamed Team Ineos to reflect the change of sponsorship. This led to several representatives of Doncaster Council stating that they will boycott the TdY when it goes through Doncaster as a protest at Ineos and its fracking programme which has a drilling site at Misson, just outside the Doncaster Council area. Councillor Dave Shaw accused the team of "rank hypocrisy" after riding with messages highlighting ocean pollution and that they were now accepting money "from one of the largest sources of that pollution."

An Ineos spokesperson refuted that and stated that "Ineos operate to the highest safety and environmental standards." Despite this, many protestors were present at the start of the stages. Friends of the Earth posted an open letter to David Brailsford, the team principal at Team Ineos, accusing Ineos of using the sport as a greenwashing exercise. Brailsford said that the protestors were perfectly entitled to their opinion but also noted that the numbers at stage one were far less than the 15,000 that the anti-fracking community had anticipated. One of Team Ineos' riders, Chris Froome also mentioned that other cycling teams had sponsors from the petrochemical industry. Froome said at the team launch on 1 May 2019; 

Stephen Park, performance director at British Cycling, also weighed in to the controversy, stating his thoughts on the team takeover; 

Protesters at Bridlington stated that Ineos were "disgusting" for using the event to promote their brand. One of those protesting said

Stages

Stage 1
2 May 2019 — Doncaster to Selby,

Stage 2
3 May 2019 — Barnsley to Bedale,

Stage 3
4 May 2019 — Bridlington to Scarborough,

Stage 4
5 May 2019 — Halifax to Leeds,

Classification leadership table
In the Tour de Yorkshire, four different jerseys were awarded. The general classification was calculated by adding each cyclist's finishing times on each stage. Time bonuses were awarded to the first three finishers on all stages: the stage winner won a ten-second bonus, with six and four seconds for the second and third riders respectively. Bonus seconds were also awarded to the first three riders at intermediate sprints; three seconds for the winner of the sprint, two seconds for the rider in second and one second for the rider in third. The leader of the general classification received a light blue and yellow jersey. This classification was considered the most important of the Tour de Yorkshire, and the winner of the classification was considered the winner of the race.

The second classification was the points classification. Riders were awarded points for finishing in the top ten in a stage. Unlike in the points classification in the Tour de France, the winners of all stages were awarded the same number of points. Points were also won in intermediate sprints; five points for crossing the sprint line first, three points for second place and one for third. The leader of the points classification was awarded a green jersey.

There was also a mountains classification, for which points were awarded for reaching the top of a climb before other riders. Each climb was categorised the same, with four points awarded to the first rider over the top of each climb. Two points were awarded for the second-placed rider, with one point for third place. The leadership of the mountains classification was marked by a pink jersey.

Another jersey was awarded at the end of each stage. This was a combativity prize and was awarded to the rider who "made the greatest effort and [...] demonstrated the best qualities in terms of sportsmanship". A jury selected a list of riders to be eligible for the prize; the winner of the prize was then decided by a vote on Twitter. The rider was awarded a grey jersey. There was also a classification for teams, in which the times of the best three cyclists in a team on each stage were added together; the leading team at the end of the race was the team with the lowest cumulative time.

References

External links

 Official website

2019 in English sport
2019 UCI Europe Tour
2019
Tour de Yorkshire